Amanda Green (born December 29, 1963) is an American actress, singer, and songwriter. In 2021, she was elected president of the Dramatists Guild of America, the first woman to hold the role in the Guild's 100-year history.

Early life and education
Born in New York City, Green was raised on the Upper West Side with her brother Adam by their parents Phyllis Newman, an actress and singer, and Adolph Green, a lyricist and playwright.

From an early age, she was exposed to major talents of musical theatre, including Leonard Bernstein, Jule Styne, and Cy Coleman, all of whom were regular guests in her home.

After graduating from Brown University in Rhode Island, Green attended an actors' training program at the Circle in the Square Theatre School in New York City and then spent two seasons at the Williamstown Theatre Festival in Williamstown, Massachusetts. She began writing songs and performing in Manhattan cabarets, like Joe's Pub.

Career
In the mid-1990s, inspired by Lyle Lovett's writing, she moved to Nashville, Tennessee to write country music.

In Los Angeles, Green wrote the lyrics for the musicals Once Upon a Primetime (2002) and Up the Week Without a Paddle (2000), which earned her a nomination from the Los Angeles Drama Critics Circle.

In New York City, a concert of Green's original revue Put a Little Love in Your Mouth!, was performed at Second Stage Theatre in March 2003, and featured Jessica Molaskey, Mario Cantone and Billy Stritch. A recording of a live performance was released on compact disc.

She wrote the lyrics for and co-starred with Nancy Opel in For the Love of Tiffany: A Wifetime Original Musical, which had a sold-out run at The Wings Theater as part of the New York International Fringe Festival in August 2003.

In July 2004, Green and her mother co-hosted a concert titled Bernstein, Comden and Green: A Musical Celebration at the Venetian Theatre at the Caramoor Center for Music and the Arts in Katonah, New York, with performers Sylvia McNair, Judy Kaye, Jason Graae and Hugh Russell.

In 2009, Green appeared in concert at Feinstein's at the Loews Regency, in New York City, with performers Jenn Colella, Ann Harada and Norm Lewis.

Green enrolled in the BMI Lehman Engel Musical Theatre Workshop, where she met Tom Kitt, who suggested the two collaborate on a musical stage adaptation of the comedy-drama film High Fidelity (2000). The show had a one-month run at Boston's Colonial Theatre, then went to New York City. The production opened on December 7, 2006 at the Imperial Theatre in New York City where, hampered by poor reviews, it closed after 14 performances.

The musical Bring It On: The Musical, with music and lyrics by Lin-Manuel Miranda, Tom Kitt and Green and book by Jeff Whitty, premiered at the Alliance Theatre in Atlanta, Georgia on January 16, 2011. Green has written a number of songs with Phish leader Trey Anastasio, one of which ("Burn That Bridge") was performed live by Anastasio in May 2010.

Green and Anastasio wrote the music, with lyrics by Green and the book by Doug Wright, for Hands on a Hardbody, which is a stage musical version of the documentary film Hands on a Hard Body: The Documentary (1997). The musical had its world premiere at the La Jolla Playhouse in San Diego, California in April 2012, and it ran on Broadway in April 2013. Green and Anastasio received a nomination for the Tony Award for Best Original Score.
 
Green is the recipient of a 2004 Jonathan Larson Award and grant for excellence in songwriting, and is a contributing writer to Playboy magazine.

In 2021, Green became the first woman president of the Dramatists Guild of America.

In 2022, Green wrote the lyrics for the Broadway musical Mr. Saturday Night, starring Billy Crystal. She received a Tony Award nomination for Best Score, with composer Jason Robert Brown. She also was nominated for the 2022 Drama Desk Award for Outstanding Lyrics for the show.

Personal life
Green and her husband, Jeffrey Kaplan, who is an orthopedic surgeon, reside in Manhattan.

Filmography

Film

Television

See also

 List of Brown University people
 List of people from New York City

References

External links

 
 
 

1965 births
20th-century American actresses
20th-century American composers
20th-century American singers
20th-century American women singers
20th-century American women writers
20th-century American writers
20th-century women composers
21st-century American actresses
21st-century American composers
21st-century American singers
21st-century American women singers
21st-century American women writers
21st-century American writers
21st-century women composers
Actresses from New York City
American cabaret performers
American magazine writers
American musical theatre actresses
American musical theatre composers
American musical theatre lyricists
American women composers
Broadway composers and lyricists
Brown University alumni
Circle in the Square Theatre School alumni
Living people
Singers from New York City
Songwriters from New York (state)
Writers from New York City